VoorNederland (translated: For Netherlands or Pro-Netherlands) was a Dutch political party. It was previously active in the House of Representatives of the Netherlands as the Group Bontes/Van Klaveren, a parliamentary group founded in April 2014. The parliamentary group was succeeded by a political party in May 2014. After failing to garner win a single seat in the 2017 general election the party disbanded.

History
The Group Bontes/Van Klaveren was a parliamentary group formed on 15 April 2014 by Louis Bontes and Joram van Klaveren, two Members of the House that had left the Party for Freedom (PVV), the party they were originally elected to represent.

On May 28, 2014, group members officially founded a new political party, VoorNederland, a classical liberal and liberal conservative and eurosceptic political party.

On 13 November 2014, the party announced that it would cooperate with the UK Independence Party in the Alliance for Direct Democracy in Europe.

In December 2014 and January 2015, VNL was joined by former PVV leader in the European Parliament Laurence Stassen and, leading up to the 2015 provincial elections, two provincial PVV representatives from Groningen and Gelderland. On 27 January 2015 it was announced that the members of the party Article 50 had voted to merge it into VoorNederland.

On 21 April 2015 it was announced that jurist and former lawyer Bram Moszkowicz would become the party leader and lijsttrekker of VoorNederland at the next Dutch general election, planned for 2017, but after nine months he was rejected by the party.

In the 2017 Dutch general election, VoorNederland failed to win a single seat, securing just 0.4% of the vote.

Because of its election failure and lack of money the party was dissolved by its members congress on 18 June 2017.

Programme
VNL was a proponent of small government and proposed the introduction of a low flat tax rate. Furthermore, it supported investment in the police and defence, and it wanted to limit the powers of the European Union to a free trade area, and a stricter immigration policy, the party had ties with UKIP.

References

External links
 

Political parties established in 2014
2014 establishments in the Netherlands
Liberal parties in the Netherlands
Conservative parties in the Netherlands
Defunct nationalist parties in the Netherlands
Right-wing populism in the Netherlands
Secularism in the Netherlands
Classical liberal parties
Liberal conservative parties
Eurosceptic parties in the Netherlands
Right-wing populist parties
Political parties disestablished in 2017
2017 disestablishments in the Netherlands